Beyrichites is an extinct genus in the ammonoids cephalopod, order Ceratitida from the Lower and Middle Triassic of southern Europe, Asia, and western North America.

Beyrichites has an involute, discoidal shell with a narrowly arched venter and sigmoidal ribbing that tends to disappear on the outer whorl. The suture is subammonitic, meaning the saddles are serrate as well as the lobes.

Two subgenera are recognized: B. (Beyrichites) from the Lower and Middle Triassic, which has no tubercles, and B. (Gangadharites) from the Middle Triassic of the Himalaya which has tubercles on the whorl sides.

References 

 Treatise on Invertebrate Paleontology, Part L; Ch. Mesozoic Ammonoidea. Geological Soc of America and U Kansas Press, R.C Moore (ed)

Ceratitoidea
Triassic ammonites of North America
Ceratitida genera
Ammonites of Europe
Middle Triassic life